ISO 20121 (full name: ISO 20121:2012, Event sustainability management systems –- Requirements with guidance for use) is a voluntary international standard for sustainable event management, created by the International Organization for Standardization. The standard aims to help organizations improve sustainability throughout the entire event management cycle.

Background
Every event – from a village barbecue to a major sporting event like the Olympics – will have economic, social and environmental impacts. Water and energy resources are put under pressure, significant amounts of waste and carbon emissions can be generated. Sometimes events can put a strain on local communities. By 2005, practitioners within the events industry were becoming aware of the need for more sustainable practices.

Specifically, the Head of Sustainability at the London 2012 Olympic and Paralympic Games, David Stubbs, was looking for a way to make good on the sustainability promises made in the London Games bid.

He raised the issue with the British Standards Institution (BSI) in the UK. This led to the creation of BS 8901:2007 Specification for a sustainable event management system with guidance for use. After a period of review, the second version of BS 8901 was published in 2009.

BS 8901 was received very positively by the international event industry, and was soon being widely used. For example, COP15, the United Nations Conference on Climate Change, was certified as compliant with BS 8901 in December 2009. The Microsoft Corporation achieved certification to BS 8901 at its Microsoft Convergence® 2009 event in New Orleans, Louisiana, in March 2009.

Development of ISO 20121
Responding to this international enthusiasm for BS 8901, in May 2009 a proposal for an international sustainable event management standard was jointly submitted to the International Organization for Standardization (ISO) by BSI Group and ABNT, the Brazilian national standards body.

Delegations of experts of the national standards institutions of 25 countries developed the standard, with another 10 countries as observers. Eight stakeholder organizations from the event industry, or with a strong interest in sustainability, also participated. Members of the sustainability team of the London 2012 Olympic and Paralympic Games were among the stakeholders who provided input into the development of the standard.
 
Subsequently, ISO 20121:2012 Event sustainability management systems –- Requirements with guidance for use was published in June 2012.

How ISO 20121 works 
ISO 20121 is relevant to all members of the event industry supply chain including organizers, event managers, stand builders, caterers and logistics suppliers.

The standard takes a management systems approach to running more sustainable events. It provides a framework to help identify the potentially negative social, economic and environmental impacts of events. Organizers can then remove or reduce negative impacts through improved planning and processes.

This should lead to improvements in key sustainability issues such as venue selection, transport, recycling or reusing demolition waste, creating a sustainable food strategy, promoting healthy living and creating skills, employment and business legacies.

The standard can reduce costs, carbon emissions and waste; better manage the biodiversity of venues; and achieve a diverse and inclusive workforce.

ISO 20121 also includes practical guidance on communications, operational planning and control, stakeholder identification and engagement, supply chain management and procurement, and issue evaluation.

ISO 20121 is suitable for all sizes and types of events.

Organizations can demonstrate voluntary conformity with ISO 20121 by either: first party self-declaration; second party confirmation of conformance by parties having an interest in the organization, such as clients; or by certification by an independent third party, e.g. a certification body.

ISO 20121 and the London 2012 Olympics 
Having been highly influential in the creation of the standard, The London Organising Committee of the Olympic and Paralympic Games (LOCOG) and the Olympic Delivery Authority both successfully implemented ISO 20121 in June 2012.
  
The Head of Sustainability, David Stubbs, commented: "London 2012 is proud to have been the catalyst for ISO 20121. This is a piece of legacy with the potential to transform how events around the world consider their economic, environmental and social impacts."

Sebastian Coe, Chair of LOCOG commented: "In our bid to host the Olympic and Paralympic Games in London, we pledged to hold the greenest Games of modern times and I am pleased to say we were hugely successful in doing this."

Another early adopter of ISO 20121 was the Weymouth and Portland National Sailing Academy (WPNSA) in the UK, which was the venue for the London 2012 sailing events.

WPNSA reported that as a result of using the standard they achieved cost savings of around 15 per cent through better waste management and electricity optimization. They also enhanced their international reputation as a sports and corporate event venue, and reduced the risks of legislative breaches. Finally, they are demonstrably operating in accordance with the ‘One Planet Living’ principles of sustainable development, which as an organization they aspire to do.

Following an extensive systems assessment, Plaza Athénée Bangkok A Royal Meridien Hotel became the first “ISO 20121 Event Sustainability Management System” hotel in the world.  Since the implementation of the system in 2012, the hotel has reduced electricity consumption by 9.4%, water by 5.03%, and paper by 4.9% year-on-year. Carbon footprint profiling revealed a 47.05% reduction in printer ink consumption and a 25.0% l in plastic bottle use.

History

See also 
Sustainable Event Management
International Organization for Standardization
BSI Group

References

External links 
International Organization for Standardization website
British Standards Institution website

20121
Sustainability